Samaritan Aviation is a 501 C-3 non-profit Christian organization that serves the population in the East Sepik Province of Papua New Guinea through emergency evacuation flights, the delivery of medical supplies, and continued community outreach and health programs. The non-profit is funded by the Papua New Guinea government and individual donations.

History
Samaritan Aviation was co-founded in 1999 by Mark Palm as a means of providing crucial medical services to the East Sepik Province of Papua New Guinea. To avoid the difficult transport through 30,000 square miles of jungle, Samaritan Aviation introduced the country’s only floatplane in 2010, a retrofitted Cessna 206, which dramatically increased the availability of healthcare to around 500,000 people. In recent years Samaritan Aviation has engaged in multi-city tours, introducing additional Cessna 206 floatplanes and making stops across the United States before shipping the planes to Papua New Guinea.

Over the years, the floatplanes have acted as flying ambulances and transport for vaccines to prevent the spread of measles, whooping cough, and polio.  After adding a second plane, two additional pilots (three in total), and a Medical Director over the course of 10 years of operations, Samaritan Aviation began planning for expansion to Papua New Guinea’s Western Province. In 2021, another city tour was organized to raise funds for the planned expansion, including stops in all over the United States, shipping the newest plane to Papua New Guinea in fall of 2022.

Partnerships

National Polio Campaign
After a resurgence of polio cases in 2018, Samaritan Aviation was called upon to partner with the ESP Provincial Health Authority, World Health Organization, and Rotary International to aid in the National Polio Vaccine Outreach.

Through the use of their floatplanes, Samaritan Aviation made deliveries of polio vaccines and cold storage equipment to remote villages in the East Sepik Province. Many of these flights also included UN experts and other field workers helping to monitor the coverage rates and impact of the vaccination campaign. This was the first national OPV campaign since 2012.

Other Partnerships 

 The East Sepik Provincial Government
 The West Sepik Provincial Government
 Aerocet
 Ambit Consulting
 AVEO Engineering
 Baylor Scott & White Health
 Catholic Health Services of PNG
 Coal Creek Consulting
 Digicel Foundation
 ECFA
 Heart to Heart International
 International Aid
 Islands Petroleum
 J.P. Instruments
 Kendall Farms
 Ministry of Health PNG
 Northwest Propeller Service Inc
 Oxfam Australia
 Pacific Islands Ministries
 Planning Center
 Project C.U.R.E.
 Save the Children Australia
 South Seas Evangelical Association
 South Seas Tuna
 Stene Aviation
 Western Skyways

References

Foreign charities operating in Papua New Guinea
Christian charities
Medical and health organisations based in Papua New Guinea
Seaplane operators